The Blue Streak is a 1926 American silent Western film directed by Noel M. Smith and starring Richard Talmadge, Charles Clary, and Louise Lorraine.

Plot

Cast
 Richard Talmadge as Richard Manley 
 Charles Clary as John Manley 
 Louise Lorraine as Inez Del Rio 
 Henry Hebert as Jack Slade 
 Charles Hill Mailes as Don Carlos 
 Victor Dillingham as Slade's Assistant 
 Tote Du Crow as Pedro

References

External links
 

1926 films
1926 Western (genre) films
Films directed by Noel M. Smith
Film Booking Offices of America films
American black-and-white films
Silent American Western (genre) films
1920s English-language films
1920s American films